Alpine forget-me-not is a common name for several plants in the Boraginaceae (forget-me-not) family and may refer to:

Eritrichium, a genus with 71 species;
Myosotis alpestris, circumpolar arctic and montane distribution.

References